William Chambers of Glenormiston  (16 April 180020 May 1883) was a Scottish publisher and politician, the brother (and business partner) of Robert Chambers. The brothers were influential in the mid-19th century, in both scientific and political circles.

Biography 
Chambers was born in Peebles the son of James Chambers a cotton mill owner, said to have 100 looms in his factory, and his wife, Jean Gibson. William was educated locally, but well, being trained in the Classics. 

The family moved to Edinburgh in 1814 to work in the book-selling trade. William was apprenticed to a John Sutherland, a bookseller with a circulating library based a 9 Calton Street at the base of Calton Hill. William was paid 4/- per week from which he paid 1/6 per week for lodgings at Boak's Land off the West Port at the west end of the Grassmarket.

William opened his own bookshop in 1819 on Broughton Street, an ancient sloping and winding street absorbed by Edinburgh's New Town. In 1820 he began printing his own works. In 1832 he founded the publishing firm of W. & R. Chambers Publishers with his younger brother Robert. They were keen advocates of popular education and his firm pioneered the use of industrial technologies within publishing to make books and newspapers available cheaply. They produced books and periodicals of Scottish interest, such as Gazetteer of Scotland. They also made money in promulgating the many new science discoveries as the modern world emerged from prior modes of thinking in such periodicals as the Edinburgh Journal. 

Their publishing business prospered, and in 1849 William purchased the Glemormiston estate near his home town of Peebles, and in 1859 Chambers founded a museum and art gallery in Peebles. The brothers collaborated on the publication of Chambers Encyclopaedia between 1860 and 1868. The Chambers Dictionary in 1872 was one of the first generally affordable dictionaries, allowing its use as a standard school text book.

William was elected a Fellow of the Royal Society of Edinburgh in 1860, his proposer was John Shank More. His address was then given as 13 Chester Street, a large townhouse in Edinburgh's west end.

As Lord Provost of Edinburgh from 1865 to 1869, Chambers was responsible for instructing the restoration of St Giles Cathedral and other major town planning exercises, including the creation of Jeffrey Street, St Marys Street and Blackfriars Street. These streets were all created under the City Improvement Act of 1866, including one named in his memory: (Chambers Street).

In 1868 he built a new printworks immediately west of the City Chambers (demolished in the 1930s).

In 1872 Edinburgh University awarded Chambers an honorary doctorate (LLD).

Chambers died at home at 13 Chester Street in Edinburgh's West End on 20 May 1883 and was buried in the family plot in Peebles Cemetery. His memorial is placed on the eastern flank of the central tower.

Greyfriars Bobby 

In 1867, in his capacity as Lord Provost of Edinburgh, William Chambers (who was also a director of the Scottish Society for the Prevention of Cruelty to Animals), granted a dog licence to Greyfriars Bobby's licence paids for by public subscription and paid for a customised dog collar, now in the Museum of Edinburgh.

Memorials

A memorial stained glass window was erected in the centre of the north aisle of St Giles Cathedral in his memory. A smaller window to his brother Robert stands to its side.

In 1891 a statue of Chambers, by local sculptor John Rhind was placed in the centre of Chambers Street. This has low-relief copper panels on the base by William Shirreffs. The statue was relocated in 2020 as part of a relancaping exercise on Chambers Street, increasing paved area outside the National Museum of Scotland.

W. & R. Chambers 

In the beginning of 1832 William Chambers started a weekly publication under the title of Chambers's Edinburgh Journal, (known since 1854 as Chambers's Journal of Literature, Science and Arts), which speedily attained a large circulation (84,000), and to which his younger brother Robert Chambers was at first only a contributor. After fourteen issues had appeared, Robert became associated with his brother as joint editor, and his collaboration may have contributed more than anything else to the success of the Journal. From September 1832 the two brothers formed the book publishing firm of W. & R. Chambers Publishers. This was originally located at 19 Waterloo Place at the east end of Princes Street.

In the mid-19th century they moved to a large premises at 339 High Street on the Royal Mile. It lay between Warriston Close and Roxburgh Close. Their premises was acquired in the 1930s by the City Chambers to build an extension to the chambers.

The firm would eventually become part of Chambers Harrap Publishers in the late 20th century.

Among the other numerous works of which Robert was in whole or in part the author, the Biographical Dictionary of Eminent Scotsmen (4 vols., Glasgow, 1832–1835), the Cyclopædia of English Literature (1844), the Life and Works of Robert Burns (4 vols., 1851), Ancient Sea Margins (1848), the Domestic Annals of Scotland (1859–1861) and the Book of Days (2 vols., 1862–1864) were the most important.

In culture
He was played by Christopher Lee in the 2005 feature film The Adventures of Greyfriars Bobby.

Publications
 Chambers's Papers for the People Vol. 1 (1850).
 A history of Peeblesshire. (1864). archive.org
 Memoir of William and Robert Chambers. (1883). archive.org
 Chambers's etymological dictionary of the English language. (1871) archive.org
 Chambers Dictionary 1872

Family

In 1833 he was married to Harriet Seddon Clark (b.1801).

See also
 Chambers Harrap Publishers
 Chambers Institution, Peebles, Scottish Borders, an arts centre, museum and library which bears W. Chambers' name.

References

Further reading

External links 
 
 
 

1800 births
1883 deaths
Lord Provosts of Edinburgh
Scottish book publishers (people)
People from Peebles
19th-century Scottish businesspeople